Athabasca (also Athabaska) is an anglicized version of the Cree name for Lake Athabasca in Canada, āthap-āsk-ā-w (pronounced ), meaning "grass or reeds here and there".  Most places named Athabasca are found in Alberta, Canada.

Athabasca may also refer to:

Geographical features
Mount Athabasca, a mountain in Jasper National Park, Canada
Athabasca Glacier, a glacier in Jasper National Park, Canada
Athabasca River, river in Alberta, Canada
Athabasca Falls, waterfalls on the Athabasca River
Peace-Athabasca Delta –  of the Peace River, Athabasca River, near Lake Athabasca
Athabasca Oil Sands – oil-producing region in Alberta, Canada
Lake Athabasca, large lake in Alberta and Saskatchewan, Canada
Athabasca Pass, a mountain pass in Jasper National Park
Athabasca Valles, a feature on the surface of the planet Mars
Athabasca Sand Dunes Provincial Park, a unique geophysical land feature in the boreal shield ecosystem Saskatchewan, Canada
Athabasca Basin, a region in Northern Saskatchewan and Alberta, the source of the world's highest grade uranium deposits

Administrative features
Athabasca, Alberta, town in Canada, formerly (1880–1914) named Athabasca Landing
Athabasca County, a municipal district in Alberta, Canada
District of Athabasca, a former district of the North-West Territory
Athabaska (electoral district), a former federal electoral district (1925–1968) in Alberta
Athabasca (electoral district), a federal electoral district (since 1968) in Alberta
Athabasca (Alberta provincial electoral district), 1905–1986
Athabasca (Saskatchewan provincial electoral district)
Athabasca University, a distance learning university in Athabasca, Alberta, Canada

Other
 Athabaskan languages, a language family indigenous to North America
 Athabaska Herald, one of the officers of arms at the Canadian Heraldic Authority
 Athabasca (novel), novel by Alistair MacLean
 Athabasca, a character in Terry Brooks's Shannara series
 Any of three ships named HMCS Athabaskan
 , see Boats of the Mackenzie River watershed
 , see Boats of the Mackenzie River watershed
 , see Boats of the Mackenzie River watershed
 , a Canadian-owned, British-registered merchant ship bombed 2 December 1943 during World War II
 Athabascaite, a mineral
 Athabaska Airways, earlier name of Transwest Air
 Athabasca Valles, a channel on the planet Mars

See also
Arthabaska (disambiguation), the name of several geographic features in Quebec, shares the same root